Aoibheann Reilly (born 1 November 2000) is an Irish rugby union player.  She represents Ireland at 15-a-side and Sevens rugby as a scrum-half.

Early life
Reilly began playing rugby for the Ballinasloe U12 Community Games team. She has been a long time teammate and friend of Beibhinn Parsons having attended primary and secondary school together before going on to play rugby for Ireland together. Her brother Colm Reilly is a scrum-half for Connacht Rugby. Her father Stephen Reilly is a former principal of Garbally College.

Career
Riley played domestically for Connacht before impressing for Blackrock College RFC in the All Ireland League. She was named in the starting XV for Ireland for the first time in March 2022 in the Women's Six Nations Championship test match against Wales. She was named as part of the Ireland team for the Rugby Sevens World Cup held in Cape Town, South Africa in September 2022.

References
 

2000 births
Living people
Irish female rugby union players
Ireland women's international rugby union players
Ireland international women's rugby sevens players
Connacht Rugby women's players
Rugby union scrum-halves
People from Ballinasloe